Black gold or Black Gold may refer to:

Commodities
 Petroleum or crude oil
 Black pepper
 Colored gold#Black gold

Arts and entertainment

Film and television
 Black Gold (1928 film), a 1928 film produced by Norman Studios
 Black Gold (1936 film), starring Frankie Darro
 Black Gold (1947 film)
 Black Gold (1962 film), an adventure film
 Gentle Ben 2: Black Gold, a 2003 remake of Gentle Ben
 Black Gold (2006 film), a documentary about the fair-trading of coffee beans
 Black Gold (2011 Nigerian film), a drama
 Black Gold (2011 Qatari film), a war film co-produced with France, Tunisia and Italy
 Black Gold (TV series), a documentary about oil-drilling in West Texas
 Black Gold (2022 TV series), a CBS News documentary series about ExxonMobil climate change denial

Music
 Black Gold (band), a band from Brooklyn, New York
 Black Gold (Jimi Hendrix recordings), an unreleased Jimi Hendrix album
 Black Gold (Nina Simone album), 1970
 Black Gold (Kutt Calhoun album), 2013
 Black Gold: The Best of Soul Asylum
 Black Gold: Best of Editors
 "Black Gold" (song), a 1993 song by Soul Asylum from Grave Dancer's Union
 "Black Gold", a 1997 song by Millencolin from For Monkeys
 "Black Gold", a 2005 song by Running Wild from Rogues en Vogue
 "Black Gold", a 2006 single by The Prom Kings
 "Black Gold", a 2010 song by Foals from Total Life Forever
 "Black Gold", a 2012 song by Esperanza Spalding from Radio Music Society

Video games
 Black Gold (video game), a video game of the strategy genre released in 1989 by reLINE Software
 World War III: Black Gold, a 2001 strategy game made by JoWood and Reality Pump
 Black Gold Online, a 2014 steampunk MMORPG Published by Snail Games

Other media
 Black Gold (novel), a 1987 novel about South Africa by Anthony Sampson
 Black Gold, a 2001 art installation by Nathaniel Mellors

Other uses
 Black Gold, Kentucky
 Black Gold (horse) (1921–1928), winner of 1924's Kentucky Derby
 Black gold (jewelry), a type of gold used in jewelry
 Black gold (politics), a term used in the Republic of China (Taiwan) to refer to political corruption

 Ouro Preto, city and former gold rush town in Minas Gerais, Brazil whose name means "Black Gold"
 Black Gold Casino, Chickasaw Nation casino in Oklahoma

See also
 Asterix and the Black Gold, the twenty-sixth volume of the Asterix comic book series
 Land of Black Gold, the fifteenth of The Adventures of Tintin
 Black and Gold (disambiguation)
 Gold (disambiguation)